Austins may refer to:

Austins, a department store in Newton Abbot, Devon, England
Austins, a former department store in Derry, Northern Ireland
Austins Bridge, an American Christian country band
Austins Bridge (album), 2007
Austins Colony
Austins Ferry, Tasmania, Australia
Austins Mill, Tennessee, United States

See also 
Austin (disambiguation)